Donnie Beechler (born May 18, 1961), is a former driver in the Indy Racing League.  He was born in Springfield, Illinois.

Beechler raced in the 1998–2001 seasons with 36 career starts, including 4 Indianapolis 500 showings.  His best career finish was 3rd, achieved twice, at the 2000 IRL Phoenix 200 won by Buddy Lazier at Phoenix International Raceway and the 2001 300-mile race won by Eddie Cheever, Jr. at Kansas Speedway.

Beechler won the 9th Annual Chili Bowl Nationals in 1995.

Since leaving IndyCars he has returned to the USAC Silver Crown Series on a part-time basis.
Also was an avid roller skater competing in several Illinois State Speed Meets.

Racing record

American Open Wheel
(key)

IndyCar results

 1 The 1999 VisionAire 500K at Charlotte was cancelled after 79 laps due to spectator fatalities.

Indy 500 results

External links
Donnie Beechler at ChampCarStats.com
Donnie Beechler bio at Driver Database

1961 births
Living people
Indianapolis 500 drivers
IndyCar Series drivers
Sportspeople from Springfield, Illinois
Racing drivers from Illinois
USAC Silver Crown Series drivers

A. J. Foyt Enterprises drivers